Antonio D'Alfonso (born 6 August 1953) is a Canadian writer,  editor, publisher, and filmmaker, best known as the founder of Guernica Editions.

Biography 
Antonio D'Alfonso was born in Montreal into an Italian-Canadian family. He grew up speaking Italian and attended both English and French schools and became trilingual. He earned a BA from Loyola College (Concordia University) and a MA from the Université de Montréal. In 1978 he founded Guernica Editions in Montreal as a bilingual publishing house. It was successful in promoting English and French language writers and expanded into publishing authors from ethnic minorities, particularly those of Italian backgrounds.  D'Alfonso sold Guernica in 2009.
As a writer, he has published works in both English and French, and has won awards in both. He is also a self-translator who rewrites his work from English to French or vice versa.

Literary awards 
 2000: Fabrizio's Passion won the Bressani Award.
 2003: La passione di Fabrizio won Internazionale emigrazione in Italy.
 2005: Un vendredi du mois d'août won the Trillium Book Award. (27 Avril 2005)
 2008: L'aimé won the Christine Dimitriu Van Saanen Award from the Salon du livre de Toronto.
 2016: He received an honorary doctorate from Athabasca University in Alberta.

Books

Original Books 
 La chanson du shaman à Sedna (poems, self-published, 1973)
 Queror (poems, Guernica Editions, 1979) 2-89135-000-6
 Black Tongue (poems, Guernica Editions, 1983) 0-919349-07-2
 The Other Shore (prose and poems, Guernica Editions, 1986, 1988) 0-919349-66-8/0-920717-32-2
 L'autre rivage (prose and poems, translation of The Other Shore, VLB éditeur, 1987) 2-89005-248-6 Finaliste du Prix Emile-Nelliagn.
 L'Amour panique (prose poems, Lèvres Urbaines, 1988) ISSN 0823-5112
 Avril ou L'anti-passion (novel, VLB éditeur, 1990) 2-89005-405-5
 Julia (long prose poem, L'édition du Silence, 1992) 2-920180-25-8
 Panick Love (prose poems, translation of L'Amour panique, Guernica Editions, 1992) 0-920717-63-2
 Fabrizio's Passion (novel, Guernica, 1995) 1-55071-023-0
 In Italics: In Defense of Ethnicity (essays, Guernica, 1996) 1-55071-016-8
 L'apostrophe qui me scinde (poetry, Le Noroît, 1998). 2-89018-398-X. Finaliste du Prix Saint Sulpice.
 Duologue: On Culture and Identity (with Pasquale Verdicchio) (essay, Guernica, 1998). 1-55071-072-9
 L'autre rivage (poetry, Le Noroît, 1999) 2-89018-438-2
 En Italiques: Réflexions sur l'ethnicité (essays, Balzac, 2000). 2-921468-21-2
 Fabrizio's Passion (novel, Guernica, 2000) 1-55071-082-6. The Bressani Award 2002.
 Comment ça se passe (poetry, Le Noroît, 2001). Finaliste du Prix Trillium.
 La passione di Fabrizio. (Traduit par Antonello Lombardo). Iannone Editore. Italia: Isernia, 2002.) The Premio internzaionale Emigrazione, 2003.
 Getting on with Politics (poetry, Exile Editions, 2002.)
 Antigone (Lyricalmyrical Editions, 2004) (verse play)
 Un vendredi du mois d'août (novel, Leméac, 2004), finalist for the Prix Ringuet, Trillium Book Award
 Bruco (Lyricalmyrical Editions, 2005) (verse play)
 En Italiques: Réflexions sur l'ethnicité (essais, L'Interligne, 2005).
 Gambling with Failure (essays, Exile, 2005)
 Un homme de trop (poetry, Noroît, 2005)
 One Friday in August (novel, Exile, 2005)
 L'aimé. novel. Leméac, 2007.
 Un ami, un nuage. Noroit, 2013.
 The Irrelevant Man. Guernica, 2014.

Anthologies Edited 
 Quêtes: Textes d'auteurs italo-québécois. ed. aver Fulvio Caccia. Guernica Editions, 1983.
 Voix Off: Textes de dix poétes anglophone au Québec.  Guernica Editions, 1985. 
 Poetica del Plurilinguismo. trans. Nicola Gasbarro & Giulia De Gasperi. Samuele Editor, 2016.

Translations by Antonio D'Alfonso 
 The Clarity of Voices Philippe Haeck, prose poems. Guernica, 1985.
 The Films of Jacques Tati  Michel Chion.  Guernica, 1997.
 La paysage qui bouge.  Pasquale Verdicchio.  Le Noroit, 2000.
 On Order and Things. Stefan Psenak.  Guernica, 2003.
 Dreaming Our Space. Marguerite Andersen.  Guernica, 2003.
 The Blueness of Light (by Louise Dupré, translator, Guernica, 2005)
 Etnilisuse kaitseks. Translated in Estonian by Reet Sool. Tartu Ulikooli Kirjastus, 2006. (essays)
 The World Forgotten (by Paul Bélanger, translator, Guernica 2005)
 The Last Woman (Claudine Bertrand, translator, Guernica, 2008)
 twohundredandfourspoems (Roger des Roches, Guernica, 2011).
 Un bonheur inattendu (Marella Caracciolo Chia, Leméac, 2011).
 Un bonheur inattendu (Marella Caracciolo Chia, Syrtes (Paris), 2012).
 Wings Folded in Cracks (Jean-Pierre Vallotton, Guernica, 2013).
 Hours (Fernand Ouellette, Guernica, 2013).
 Found in Translation: An Anthology of Poets from Quebec (Ekstasis, 2013)
 États des lieux: Trieze poètes américains contemporains (edited by Antoine Boisclair, Noroît, 2013) (Translation of poems by Fanny Howe)
 Ne m'interrompez pas (avec Suzanne Biron) (photos, Noroît, 2015)
 Beyond the Flames (Louise Dupré, Guernica, 2014) 
 The Body Vagabond (Martine Audet, Ekstasis, 2014)
 The Terror Chronicles (Normand De Bellefeuille, Ekstasis, 2014)
 Words and the Stone (Pierrettte Micheloud, Ekstasis, 2014)
 Manhattan Poems (Claudio Angelini, Ekstasis, 2014) 
 Farida (Naïm Kattan, translated with Norman Cornett, Guernica, 2015) 
 The Intimate Frailty of Mortals (Paul Chamberland, Ekstasis, 2015) 
 I Travel the World  (Thierry Renard, Ekstasis, 2015) 
 Weeping Will Not Save the Stars (François Guerrette, Ekstasis, 2015)
 The Wind Under Our Footsteps (Diane Régimbald, Ekstasis, 2016) 
 Antigone (Ekstasis, 2016) 
 Em itálico: Reflexões sobre a etnicidade (trans. Ana Lucia Silva Paranhos, UFRGS, 2016)
 We are what we love (Bernard Pozier, Ekstasis, 2016)
 Sails for Exile (Mona Latif-Ghattas, Ekstasis, 2016)
 Toward the Rising Sun (Robert Giroux, Ekstasis, 2016)

Films 
 L'Ampoule brûlée (short 16 mm, black and white, 1973)
 La Coupe de Circé (short 16 mm, black and white, 1974)
 Pour t'aimer (one-half hour 16 mm black and white, 1982–1987)
 The Minotaur (one-hour film project, 1992)
 Consent (unproduced screenplay co-written with Jennifer Dale)
 My Trip to Oaxaca (Video, 90 minutes, 2005)
 Bruco (feature, video, 90 minutes, 2005)
 Antigone (feature, 90 minutes, 2012)
 Real Gangsters (actor, Frank D'Angelo, 2013)
 Duse and Me (three minute short, 2015)
 "La chambre éphémère" (75 minutes, 2017)
 "Live in Toronto (60 minutes, 2017)

Music 
 Night Talks (1997, CD 50:49 minutes)
 Passione e po' di vino (poetry and music, 2001, with Angelo Findaldi and band) Bootleg
 Sub Urban Gypsy (compositions with Dominic Mancuso, Dominic Mancuso Group, 2014).

References

External links 
 Official Website
  The author's item at Athabasca University, Canadian-English Writers; with hyperlinks
  D'Alfonso's item at Athabasca University, Canadian-French Writers; with other hyperlinks

20th-century Canadian poets
20th-century Canadian male writers
Canadian male poets
21st-century Canadian poets
20th-century Canadian novelists
21st-century Canadian novelists
Canadian male novelists
Film directors from Montreal
Writers from Montreal
Living people
1953 births
Canadian book editors
Canadian people of Italian descent
20th-century Canadian translators
21st-century Canadian translators
Canadian male essayists
20th-century Canadian essayists
21st-century Canadian essayists
21st-century Canadian male writers
Canadian poets in French
Canadian novelists in French